Hedyosmum racemosum is a species of tree in the Chloranthaceae family. It is native to South America.

References 

racemosum
Trees of Colombia
Trees of Peru
Trees of Ecuador
Trees of Brazil
Trees of Venezuela
Trees of Bolivia